The 2002 Brown Bears football team was an American football team that represented Brown University during the 2002 NCAA Division I-AA football season. Brown tied for second-to-last in the Ivy League. 

In their fifth season under head coach Phil Estes, the Bears compiled a 2–8 record and were outscored 278 to 222. Chas Gessner and A.W. Gallagher were the team captains. 

The Bears' 2–5 conference record tied for sixth place in the Ivy League standings. Brown was outscored 160 to 135 by Ivy opponents. 

Brown played its home games at Brown Stadium in Providence, Rhode Island.

Schedule

References

Brown
Brown Bears football seasons
Brown Bears football